John Gourlay may refer to:

 John Gourlay (soccer), Canadian soccer player
 John Gourlay (Scottish footballer)
 John Lowry Gourlay, Canadian settler and Presbyterian minister